Mas de las Matas is a municipality in the province of Teruel, Aragon, Spain. According to the 2018 census (INE), the municipality has a population of 1,299 inhabitants.

Mas de las Matas is located 5 km to the west of Aguaviva in picturesque surroundings.

See also
Bajo Aragón, comarca
Lower Aragon, traditional region

References

External links 
Web de Lo Mas de las Matas

Municipalities in the Province of Teruel
Maestrazgo